The 2016 African Qualification Tournament for Rio Olympic Games was held in Agadir, Morocco from February 6 to February 7, 2016. Each country may enter maximum 2 male and 2 female divisions with only one in each division and the first two ranked athletes per weight division qualify their NOCs a place each for Olympic Games.

Medalists

Men

Women

Qualification summary

Results

Men

−58 kg
6 February

−68 kg
7 February

−80 kg
7 February

+80 kg
6 February

Women

−49 kg
6 February

−57 kg
7 February

−67 kg
6 February

+67 kg
7 February

References

1st day results
2nd day results

External links
 World Taekwondo Federation

Olympic Qualification
Taekwondo Olympic Qual
Taekwondo qualification for the 2016 Summer Olympics
2016 in Moroccan sport